WQHT (97.1 FM, Hot 97) is a commercial radio station, licensed to New York, New York, which broadcasts an urban contemporary music format. The station is owned by Mediaco Holding, a subsidiary of the Standard General hedge fund, and operated by Emmis Communications under a shared services agreement.

WQHT's studios are located in the Hudson Square neighborhood of lower Manhattan, and its transmitter is located at the Empire State Building.

History 

WQHT began as an experimental station, W2XWG, licensed to the National Broadcasting Company (NBC) and located at the Empire State Building in New York City. W2XWG started operations in April 1939, initially as an "Apex" station, used for determining the coverage area of transmitting frequencies higher than those used by the standard AM broadcast band. These tests also compared amplitude modulation (AM) transmissions with the then-new technology of wide-band frequency modulation (FM). On January 11, 1940, W2XWG began regular FM broadcasts, and that July, it was reported that the station was broadcasting on 42.6 MHz from 3 to 11 p.m. on Mondays through Fridays.

In May 1940, the Federal Communications Commission (FCC) announced the establishment, effective January 1, 1941, of an FM band operating on 40 channels spanning 42–50 MHz. The first fifteen commercial FM station construction permits were issued on October 31, 1940, including one to NBC for 45.1 MHz in New York City, which was issued the call sign W51NY. However, NBC reported that equipment shortages resulting from the outbreak of World War II meant it was unable to get delivery of W51NY's high powered transmitter, and on June 10, 1942, the construction permit for commercial operation was canceled, and the W51NY call sign deleted. Meanwhile, the station continued broadcasts under its W2XWG experimental authorization, using its original, lower powered, transmitter, now on 45.1 MHz.

Effective November 1, 1943, the FCC modified its policy for FM station call letters. Thus, when the construction permit for commercial operation was reactivated, it was assigned the call letters WEAF-FM. The station's last broadcast as W2XWG took place on September 23, 1944, with its debut as WEAF-FM coming the next day, now with seven-day-a-week programming from 3-11 p.m. that was an expansion over W2XWG's schedule of only operating Saturday through Wednesday.

The FCC later reassigned the original FM band frequencies to other services, and ordered existing stations to move to a new band from 88 to 106 MHz, which was later expanded to 88–108 MHz. During a transition period from the original FM "low band" to the new "high band", some stations for a time broadcast simultaneously on both their old and new frequencies. However, WEAF-FM did not, and in October 1945, it was announced that the station was shutting down the broadcasts on 45.1 MHz and was temporarily going silent while it made the technical adjustments needed to operate on its new assignment at 97.3 MHz.

WNBC-FM / WRCA-FM / WNWS-FM (1946–1977) 

In late 1946, the station's call letters were changed to WNBC-FM. Programming was usually simulcasts of WNBC (AM)'s programming. A reallocation in the fall of 1947 moved the station to its current frequency assignment of 97.1 MHz. In the 1950s, WNBC-FM played classical music, later switching to pop music. It ran network programming for some time, such as the NBC Monitor weekend series. On October 18, 1954, the call letters were changed to WRCA-FM, reflecting NBC's then-parent company, the Radio Corporation of America, but returned to WNBC-FM on May 22, 1960.

By the 1970s, the station was playing a pop-rock format.  Beginning on June 4, 1973, it experimented with fully automated programming with local inserts known as "The Rock Pile", a forerunner of today's DJ-free adult hits format, with a wide diversity of pop, rock and R&B that proved to be 30 years ahead of its time. However, technical glitches were frequent and listenership dropped.  For a brief period starting in late 1974, the station attempted a fully automated beautiful music format for a younger demographic, called "The Love of New York".

In 1975, NBC Radio launched the NBC News and Information Service (NIS), a network service providing up to 50 minutes an hour of news programming to local stations that wanted to adopt an all-news format without the high cost of producing large quantities of local news content. WNBC-FM's small audience was deemed expendable to allow NIS to have a New York outlet, and on June 18, 1975, the station became WNWS-FM, branding itself NewsCenter 97, an allusion to sister station WNBC-TV's NewsCenter 4 local newscasts. Ratings were low — at the network's peak, only 57 stations across the country carried NIS, most of them already NBC Radio News affiliates — and the service did not attract enough stations to allow NBC to project that it could ever become profitable.

On December 31, 1976, the station discontinued carrying NIS (which NBC would end by June 1977). The final story on NewsCenter 97, was reported by Wayne Howell Chappelle, known professionally as Wayne Howell. The station then went to a commercial break and, after airing the hourly legal ID at midnight, switched to an adult contemporary music format with a rock lean, under the moniker Y-97. The first song played under the new format was "Tonight's the Night" by Rod Stewart.

WYNY (1977–1988) 

Shortly after adopting the new music format, the station call letters were changed to WYNY. The station was now primarily competing against WKTU. Ratings were fair at best, and by the end of 1978, after toying briefly with an all-Beatles format, WYNY evolved to an MOR format featuring Frank Sinatra, The Carpenters, Elvis Presley, Barry Manilow, Tony Bennett, Neil Diamond, Elton John, Carly Simon, and Billy Joel among others. They were an easy listening station without all the elevator music heard on WRFM or WPAT-AM-FM. Ratings went up gradually.

By 1980, WYNY moved away from Frank Sinatra and the Lettermen, though they continued running "Saturday with Sinatra" hosted by Sid Mark. Musically, they added Motown songs, the Beatles, the Beach Boys, Fleetwood Mac, the Eagles, the Doobie Brothers, Donna Summer, and soft hits by hard rockers. By 1981, the station format was that of pop hits from 1964 to what was then current music, with an occasional pre-'64 rock & roll song. Ratings went up from 1981 through 1983. By 1982, WYNY trimmed the '60s music slightly. Some of the air personalities included Dan Daniel, Bill St. James, Bruce Bradley, Randy Davis, Carol Mason, Mike McCann, Floyd Wright, Steve O'Brien, Bill Rock, Margaret Jones, Paulie, and Ed Baer.

On Sunday evenings, the station aired a pioneering advice show, "Sexually Speaking", which made host Dr. Ruth Westheimer (also known as "Dr. Ruth") a national celebrity. The station was also a pioneer of contemporary Christian music in the city, airing the weekly show Masterpeace, hosted by Steven Joseph. Sid Mark continued hosting "Saturday with Sinatra". On weekend evenings call-in talk shows, such as "Mouth Versus Ear" with Dick Summer, was an alternative to other stations mundane public service shows.

In 1983, WHTZ and WPLJ both adopted a contemporary hit radio (CHR) format, attracting younger listeners. WYNY continued with its AC format. Then in January 1984, WLTW signed on, taking away older listeners. WYNY's ratings plummeted, and in 1986, the station was revamped with the music staying "Hot AC", but marketed as a "Z-100 for Yuppies". The station had new jingles and imaging, and became known as "The NEW 97.1 WYNY". The format, however, was that of the same pop hits from 1964 to the then-present. The station continued to rate low. Station owner NBC had problems with sister station WNBC as well.

In April 1987, country music station WHN announced plans to go to sports full-time on July 1, becoming all-sports WFAN. In response, WYNY announced it would change to country music on the same day. This format change was announced to the press in advance, but not over the air except on Saturday With Sinatra. At 12:01 a.m. on July 1, WYNY ended its AC format with "Hello, Goodbye" by The Beatles and went country, playing "Think About Love" by Dolly Parton. The airstaff all remained, though some gradually left later in the year. Dan Daniel (who had left WYNY in the mid-1980s and returned), Randy Davis, Carol Mason, Lisa Taylor, Floyd Wright, and others survived the format change and remained with WYNY's country unit even after it left 97.1 FM and moved to 103.5 FM, where it remained until its 1996 demise.

WQHT (1988–present) 

In 1988, NBC began to sell its roster of radio stations, and Emmis Communications made arrangements to buy its two New York City stations, WYNY and WNBC (AM). However, at this time, FCC regulations limited owners to just one AM and one FM station per market, and Emmis already owned stations WQHT (then at 103.5 FM), and WFAN (1050 AM). Because the NBC stations had better coverage, Emmis decided to move the call letters and formats from its current stations to its new ones, then divest the two original stations.

Emmis sold the 103.5 FM license for the original WQHT to Westwood One, as well as the intellectual property for WYNY, which resulted in the WYNY call letters and country format transferring from 97.1 to 103.5 FM. Conversely, Emmis transferred the WQHT call sign and rhythmic contemporary format from 103.5 to the former WYNY at 97.1 FM, becoming "Hot 97" at 5:30 p.m. September 22, 1988. The last song played on "Hot 103" was Debbie Gibson's "Stayin' Together"; the first song played on "Hot 97" was MARRS' "Pump Up the Volume". After the transition to Hot 97, Stephanie Miller and Howard Hoffman were brought in to do the morning show, J. Paul Emerson stayed on as newsman, with Daniel Ivankovich ("Reverend Doctor D") and brought in as producer.

WQHT started to lean towards top 40 by 1989 due to decreasing ratings. By 1990, the station started playing more house, freestyle, and rhythm and blues music, and launched the Saturday Night House Party show. WQHT broadcast live from area night clubs such as The Tunnel, Roseland and Metrohouse from 2 a.m. until 4 a.m. Saturday into Sunday morning.

In 1991, Anything Goes with Clivilles & Cole debuted, where record producers Robert Clivilles and David Cole of C&C Music Factory mixed new house and dance music on Saturday nights.

From dance to hip-hop and R&B 
Towards the end of 1992 and early 1993, Hot 97 dropped to "dead last among New York's three pop stations." In response, Emmis named Judy Ellis its General Manager (a position in which she served until 2003), and WQHT started to add more R&B and hip hop music. The station started a gradual two-year change towards an urban-oriented rhythmic top 40 format.

A new generation of "hot jocks" began appearing on "Hot 97". Dan Charnas recounted the perception of this move: "The trades ran stories on the new trend, typified by the Emmis stations, Hot 97 and Power 106: hiring street kids or entertainers with little or no radio experience at the expense of longtime professionals who had paid their dues." Among the most famous was the addition of a new morning show hosted by Ed Lover and Doctor Dré of Yo! MTV Raps. With rising ratings and a focus on East Coast artists like the Wu-Tang Clan, Charnas credited "Hot 97" as leading a comeback for East Coast hip hop.

In 1993, Funkmaster Flex joined the station and was host of the Friday Night Street Jam and a weekly two-hour show where he mixed hip-hop live from the studio.

Other noteworthy personalities included the addition of Wendy Williams to afternoon drive (Williams used to be the overnight jock back on "Hot 103" in 1988). Angie Martinez, a researcher on WABC-TV's New York Hot Tracks in the late 1980s and who previously worked in the promotions department, was promoted to nights. A few years later, the two had a public falling out, resulting in Williams being fired from WQHT and Martinez assuming afternoon drive, where she remained until she was hired by WWPR-FM on June 19, 2014.

In 1995, WQHT again became New York's top station in the Arbitron ratings. While the station reported as a rhythmic CHR, the station was musically more of an urban contemporary format leaning toward hip hop, though in some trades, they reported as a rhythmic CHR.

In the fall of 2008, WQHT served as the home of the nationally syndicated Big Boy's Neighborhood, produced by ABC Radio and based at WQHT's sister station, KPWR in Los Angeles. However, by July 2009, WQHT dropped the program and instead expanded their local morning show hosted by new morning jocks DJ Cipha Sounds and Peter Rosenberg.

By 2010, WQHT switched to urban contemporary, ending the longtime rhythmic top 40 format at the station.

Sale to Standard General 
On July 1, 2019, Emmis Communications announced that it would sell WQHT and sister station WBLS to the public company Mediaco Holding—an affiliate of Standard General—for $91.5 million and a $5 million promissory note. In addition, Emmis will take a 23.72% stake in the new company's common equity, and continue to manage the stations under shared services agreements. The sale was completed November 25, 2019.

HD radio operations 
On September 9, 2008, Emmis announced a programming partnership with WorldBand Media and to use WQHT's HD-3 signal to produce programming for the South Asian communities in three major cities including New York City.  In June 2009, the service was removed from WQHT and placed on sister station WRKS's HD2.

In January 2012, Emmis added WRXP, which was formerly on WFAN-FM and streaming online, to their HD2 sub-channel. With this move, the station no longer streamed online. In 2014, WQHT-HD2 began airing HumDesi Radio, a South Asian-focusing radio network.

Controversies

2004 Indonesia tsunami parody 
On January 17, 2005, Miss Jones provoked a controversy by airing a song entitled "Tsunami Song" a month after approximately 167,000 people in Indonesia and 227,000 people worldwide were left dead or missing from the 2004 Indian Ocean earthquake and tsunami which affected the Asia-Pacific and Somalia. The song, a parody sung to the 1985 tune "We Are the World", was criticized for overtly racist mocking of the Asian victims; the song lyrics contain the racially derogatory word "Chinamen," and calls the drowning victims "bitches." Some of the lyrics included the words "Go find your mommy. I just saw her float by, a tree went through her head. And now your children will be sold into child slavery."

Miss Info, a fellow on-air colleague of Korean descent, was outraged and spoke against the song on the station. She excluded herself from producing the song and said it was wrong for it to be played. Miss Info was insulted by other DJs on the air. Another jock on the show, Todd Lynn, muttered "I'm gonna start shooting Asians." Following angry protests from the public, Miss Jones, DJ Envy, and Tasha Hightower were suspended for two weeks while Todd Lynn and songwriter Rick Del Gado were fired. The station issued an apology on its website. Newsday, Sprint, McDonald's and Toyota all pulled their advertising from the station. The suspended employees' pay was diverted to charities helping victims of the tsunami.

Fights and shootings 
On February 25, 2001, a shootout erupted between  Lil' Kim  and the entourages of Kim and rival rapper Foxy Brown in front of the offices of Hot 97 on Hudson Street, with an injury to one of Lil' Kim's bodyguards. It led to an investigation by the FBI and a trial which found Lil Kim guilty of perjury and sentenced to a year in prison for it in mid-2005. In February 2005, gunfire erupted in front of the same place between 50 Cent's entourage and the Game's entourage. The Game was quickly met by 50 Cent's crew after being notified he was at the front entrance of the building. A friend of 50 Cent pulled a gun out and shot at The Game and his entourage. A bullet hit a member of the Game's entourage in the leg. Both incidents also led to the nickname "Shot 97" by Wendy Williams.

Concerts 

Since its inception, WQHT has held "The Hot 97 Summer Jam" every June. The concert series, originally featuring Dance artists until its shift to Hip-Hop acts, has run into frequent controversy.

Wu Tang Clan member Inspectah Deck stated that the group faced a 10-year blacklist by Hot 97 after a fiasco involving their booking at the concert.  In June 1997, the group was on tour with Rage Against the Machine in Europe in support of the Wu-Tang Forever album, but was also booked to perform at the Summer Jam.  Deck stated that the station strong-armed the group in to flying back to the United States at their own cost to perform at the show for free, lest their relationship with the station be in jeopardy. As Hot 97 was one of the major stations that gave the group exposure during their early years, they felt it best to perform at the Summer Jam, not wanting to lose a major ally.  Wu Tang member Ghostface Killah was so infuriated by this, that he shouted "Fuck Hot 97!" during the set, and got the crowd to repeatedly chant it.  This led to what Deck says was a 10-year blacklist of Wu Tang from Hot 97, and even other New York radio stations, which affected their commercial reputation and music sales.  The two sides would later make amends, and Wu Tang Clan performed a set at the 2013 Summer Jam.

Other notable controversies include a 2001 show in which Jay Z put embarrassing childhood photos of Mobb Deep’s Prodigy “up on that Summer Jam screen”.  The 2002 concert saw a bailout from headliner Nas after the station objected to him hanging an effigy of Jay Z from the stage during the height of their rivalry.  Later beefs involving 50 Cent and Ja Rule, Eminem’s feud with The Source, a 2006 show that had Busta Rhymes parading a series of rap legends onstage, and then-Hot 97 airstaffer Miss Jones dissing Mary J. Blige on air after the singer did not mention her name when she sent shout-outs to the Hot 97 DJs.  The 2007 show saw Kanye West and Swizz Beatz engaging in a beat battle.  The 2009 show saw Jay Z rapping “D.O.A. (Death of Autotune)” next to T-Pain (criticizing his use of the aforementioned technique on his songs).

The 2012 event made headlines when moments before Nicki Minaj was about to take to the stage, morning host Peter Rosenberg made a negative comment about her song "Starships", saying to the fans, "I see the real hip-hop heads sprinkled in here. I see them. I know there are some chicks here waiting to sing 'Starships' later—I'm not talking to y'all right now." That comment and the alleged sexual relationship between the self-proclaimed "Queen of rap" and the host Ebro Darden would prompt Lil Wayne to pull Minaj and the rest of the acts signed to Cash Money Records out of the event. Minaj later spoke to Funkmaster Flex about the incident. After that, she appeared on Rosenberg's show, with the host apologizing to her on air. She performed two songs with 2 Chainz at the following year's Summer Jam.

The 2014 event that took place on June 2 would be blasted in a comment five days later (on June 6) by Chuck D of Public Enemy, who accused the station of allowing artists who were performing there to use racial slurs and offensive language, calling it a "Sloppy Fiasco," adding that "If there was a festival and it was filled with anti-Semitic slurs... or racial slurs at anyone but black people, what do you think would happen? Why does there have to be such a double standard?" He also cites the lack of WQHT not allowing more up-and-coming artists to perform on stage. This was later addressed by Ebro Darden and Rosenberg on their morning show, responding to remarks that include the charge that Hot 97 is a “CORPlantation,” but Darden, who admits that he agrees with Chuck D on addressing the issues, later pointed out by responding that “I think there’s validity to what he’s saying as to, ‘I guess Hot 97 could be more local,” and added “But people that listen to us when we research the songs don’t vote those songs high enough to stay around. I have this debate and I put the onus back on the public to participate.”

On June 7, 2015, more than 61 people were arrested and 10 New Jersey State Police troopers were injured after a fight over tickets and crowd capacity overshadows the 2015 Summer Jam event that was held at MetLife Stadium in East Rutherford, New Jersey. The sold-out event also caused confusion among the ticket goers who were denied entry, which added to the rioted melee. The following day (June 8), WQHT addressed the issue on its morning show and plans to refund the customers who could not get into the event, while the American Civil Liberties Union's New Jersey chapter called for the state Attorney General's office to investigate if any violations were reported. In the same year, Travis Scott blasted Hot 97 for not allowing him to use a screen at Summer Jam, and later incited a riot.

Although the Festival Village portion was cancelled due to weather for the 2016 event, Hot 97 confirmed their annual Summer Jam will continue "rain or shine".

The event and its influence, despite losing credibility, constant rivalry between artists and with the station itself, and declining audiences, continues to be a legacy for WQHT. As Funkmaster Flex puts it: “I think a radio station such as Hot 97 has a way of keeping to the pulse...And I think why it has survived so long is you know the radio station knows what artists are on the cusp or on the come up, and they always know the legends that people wanna see.”

On-air
On December 13, 2018, rapper Kodak Black walked out of the Ebro in the Morning show after host, Ebro Darden questioned Black about his ongoing sexual assault case.

Violence and drill music controversy
In 2022, some individuals drew connections between the pro-gun content of Brooklyn drill to real-world gun violence on the streets of New York that had killed a number of Brooklyn drill artists.

In response to the large number of dead young people connected to the music scene, Hot 97's DJ Drewski  vowed to stop playing gang/diss records in February 2022 and Ebro Darden re-iterated his ongoing objection to playing diss tracks that incite specific violence.

Notable staff

Current

 DJ Jabba
 Ebro Darden
 Nessa
 Lisa Evers
 DJ Enuff
 Peter Rosenberg
 Laura Stylez
 Funkmaster Flex

Former 

 Sunny Anderson 
 Al "Nouveau" Bandiero
 Lil Nat 
 Buckwild
 Doctor Dré
 Joe Budden
 Sway
 DJ Envy
 DJ Cocoa Chanelle
 DJ Red Alert
 DJ Green Lantern
 Flavor Flav
 Fatman Scoop
 Glenn Friscia
 Lisa G.
 DJ Kay Slay
 Howard Hoffman 
 DJ Skribble
 Miss Jones
 Vic Latino
 DJ Mister Cee 
 Angie Martinez
 Raqiyah Mays
 Ralph McDaniels
 DJ Megatron
 Stephanie Miller  
 DJ Whoo Kid 
 David Morales
 Frankie Knuckles
 Miss Info 
 Chuck Riley
 Ed Lover
 Scottie Beam
 DJ Clue? 
 Cipha Sounds
 DJ Jazzy Joyce
 La La Vasquez
 Johnny Vicious
 Wendy Williams

In popular culture

Films and television
 In the 30 Rock episode called "The Source Awards", Tracy Jordan mentions Hot 97 as a traditional place to get shot.
 The Sklar Brothers riff on Hot 97 in their Comedy Central Presents special.
 In the Seinfeld episode called "The Pool Guy", Kramer mentions Hot 97 as one of the sponsors to his fraudulent Moviefone information line.
 In the movie World Trade Center, one of the officers says that his wife heard on Hot 97 that a second plane had hit the towers, to which another officer replies: "Who gets their news from Hot 97?"
 In the 2002 film, "Brown Sugar", Hot 97 is featured with Angie Martinez.
 In For All Mankind, an American alternate history streaming series, Hot 97 is one of the stations for which Tracy Stevens, an astronaut and celebrity, is seen recording station identifications for while stationed on the Moon.

Music
 In Puff Daddy's song "All About The Benjamins", he says, "...Ain't nobody's hero, but I wanna be heard on your Hot 9-7 everyday, that's my word..."
 In Jay-Z's song "Death of Auto-tune (D.O.A)" he mentions the radio station, saying "This is for Hot 9-7" and mentions the station's former disc jockey, DJ Clue? as well as two long-time DJs in the line, "I made this just for Flex 'n Mr. Cee."
 In Black Star's song "What's Beef", Mos Def says: "Beef ain't the summer Jam on Hot Ninety-Seven".
 In Big Pun's song with Inspectah Deck and Prodigy "Tres Leches (Triboro Trilogy)", Big Pun says: "Take all you made, call you gay on Hot 97".
 In Public Enemy's song "Shake Your Booty" Flavor Flav says "we gonna flip it off the moon Back to New York, and flip it down Broadway Ya kno what I'm sayin? All the way down to Hot 97"

Video games
 In Grand Theft Auto IV there is a radio station called "Beat 102.7" which parodies Hot 97 and has its real life hosts DJ Mister Cee and Funkmaster Flex.

See also
 Media in New York City

Notes

References

Sources
 WNBC-FM Abandons Rock For Popular Music Format – The New York Times, December 18, 1974.
  Asian Media Watchdog – One of the high profile groups that organized Tsunami Song protest
 Freestyle Music Information
 Station info on New York Radio Guide
 Former Presidents and the Hot 97 Controversy
 World Music Central – British MPs deplore Hot 97's racist tsunami song
 World Music Central – Demonstrations planned outside Hot 97 New York
 Media Week Headlines
 UK Chinese – Chinese Community ask George Bush and Tony Blair to take action against Hot 97
 UK Chinese – British MPs and the Hot 97 Tsunami Song
 Club LK.US –  UK Sri Lankans denounce Hot 97's racist tsunami song
 Sunday Island Sri Lanka – Two tsunami songs mentioned in the British parliament with kudos to Nimal Mendis by Nan
 House of Congress Press Release from House Democratic Leader Nancy Pelosi: Pelosi Condemns Broadcast of ‘Tsunami Song’
 Hot 97 New Yorker article

External links 
 Hot 97 website
 

Urban contemporary radio stations in the United States
QHT
Radio stations established in 1940
Emmis Communications radio stations
1940 establishments in New York City
Hudson Square